ABC station(s) may refer to:

 Television stations affiliated with the American Broadcasting Company:
 List of ABC television affiliates (by U.S. state)
 List of ABC television affiliates (table)
 ABC Owned Television Stations

 ABC (Australian TV channel), the flagship TV channel of the Australian Broadcasting Corporation

See also
 ABC (disambiguation)